Salamanca Township is a township in Cherokee County, Kansas, USA.  As of the 2000 census, its population was 569.

Geography

References
 USGS Geographic Names Information System (GNIS)

External links
 City-Data.com

Townships in Cherokee County, Kansas
Townships in Kansas